Duple metre (or Am. duple meter, also known as duple time) is a musical metre characterized by a primary division of 2 beats to the bar, usually indicated by 2 and multiples (simple) or 6 and multiples (compound) in the upper figure of the time signature, with  (cut time), and  (at a fast tempo) being the most common examples.

Shown below are a simple and a compound duple drum pattern.

Though it must, the upper figure being divisible by 2 does not of itself indicate duple metre.

Although jazz writing has become more adventurous since Dave Brubeck's Time Out, the majority of jazz and jazz standards are still in four time.

Duple time is common in many styles including the polka, notorious for its obvious "oom-pah" duple feel. Compare to the waltz.

Quadruple metre

Shown below are a simple and a compound quadruple drum pattern.

Sources

Time signatures